The third edition of the Chihuahua Express started on March 27 and finished on March 29.

Results

By stage

References

Chihuahua Express
Chihuahua Express
2009 in Mexican motorsport